The 1988 Chicago Marathon was the 11th running of the annual marathon race in Chicago, United States and was held on October 30. The elite men's race was won by Mexico's Alejandro Cruz in a time of 2:08:57 hours and the women's race was won by America's Lisa Rainsberger in 2:29:17. It marked the return of the marathon distance at the competition, following a half marathon in 1987 due to sponsorship issues. A total of 5795 runners finished the race, a drop of over 2000 from the previous marathon-length outing in 1986.

Results

Men

Women

References

Results. Association of Road Racing Statisticians. Retrieved 2020-05-25.

External links 
 Official website

1988
Chicago
1980s in Chicago
1988 in Illinois
Chicago Marathon
Chicago Marathon